Several municipalities in the Canadian province of Quebec held elections on November 4, 2001, to elect mayors, reeves, and city councillors. The most closely watched contest was in the newly amalgamated city of Montreal, where Gérald Tremblay defeated incumbent Pierre Bourque.

Results

Longueuil

Montreal

Mont-Saint-Michel

Source: Élections municipales 2001 - Résultats des élections pour le poste de maire, Affaires municipales, Régions et Occupation du territoire Québec.

Potton

Source: "Election 2001 Sherbrooke & Townships," Sherbrooke Record, 6 November 2001, p. 5.

References

 
2001
November 2001 events in Canada